Marko Pešić (born 6 December 1976) is a German professional basketball executive and former player, currently serving as the general manager in the Bayern Munich of the Basketball Bundesliga. He represented Germany internationally. His father is a Serbian basketball coach and former player Svetislav Pešić.

Early life 
Pešić was born in Sarajevo, SR Bosnia and Herzegovina, SFR Yugoslavia. His father Svetislav played for the Sarajevo-based team Bosna of the Yugoslav Basketball League during that time. He moved to Germany in 1987 when his father become a head coach of the Germany national basketball team.

Playing career 
Pešić spent most of his professional basketball career with the Alba Berlin of the German League. He also stints with RheinEnergie Köln, as well as the Iraklis Thessaloniki of the Greek Basket League, and the Lottomatica Roma and the Teramo Basket in Italy.

His father was his coach while he played for the Alba Berlin (1995–99) and the Lottomatica Roma (2005–06).

National team career 
As a player for the Germany national team Pešić won a silver medal at the EuroBasket 2005 in Serbia and Montenegro and  a bronze medal at the 2002 FIBA World Championship in the United States.

Post-playing career 
Following his active career, Pešić studied sports marketing and communication at the University of Venice. In 2007, he became self-employed as a consultant at the company Lumani 10.7 GmbH. In 2008, he successfully completed his studies as a sports manager at IST Düsseldorf, which he had begun during his career as a player.

For the 2011–12 season, Pešić became the new sports director of the basketball division of the FC Bayern Munich. On 11 January 2013, he took over the position of general manager at the Bayern Munich.

On 29 March 2018, Bayern Munich sacked head coach Aleksandar Đorđević after the elimination in the semifinal of EuroCup. During Đorđević coaching tenure, Bayern Munich held first position in the 2017–18 Basketball Bundesliga with 23–2 score before got sacked. Few days after the dismissal, Đorđević qualified it as an "insult for common sense", especially since the 2017–18 season was one of the most successful in team's history. Đorđević also added that there was apparently a disagreement between team's management (in particular Pešić) and his coaching staff, as Đorđević didn't allow bigger involvement of team's management in coaching decisions.

Personal life
German former basketball player Jan Jagla is his brother in law.

Career achievements and awards
As player
German League champion: 6 (with Alba Berlin: 1996–97, 1997–98, 1998–99, 2000–01, 2001–02, 2002–03)
German Cup winner: 5 (with Alba Berlin: 1996–97, 1998–99, 2001–02, 2002–03; with RheinEnergie Köln: 2004–05)

As general manager
German League champion: 1 (with FC Bayern Munich: 2013–14)

References

External links

1976 births
Living people
Alba Berlin players
Ca' Foscari University of Venice alumni
Serbian expatriate basketball people in Greece
German men's basketball players
German people of Serbian descent
German people of Bosnia and Herzegovina descent
Iraklis Thessaloniki B.C. players
Köln 99ers players
Pallacanestro Virtus Roma players
Basketball players from Sarajevo
Serbs of Bosnia and Herzegovina
Serbian emigrants to Germany
Serb diaspora sportspeople
2002 FIBA World Championship players
Shooting guards
German expatriate basketball people in Greece
Serbian expatriate basketball people in Italy
German expatriate basketball people in Italy
Serbian basketball executives and administrators